The 2006 Stan James World Matchplay was the 13th staging of the World Matchplay darts tournament, organised by the Professional Darts Corporation. It was held at the Winter Gardens, Blackpool between 23–29 July 2006.

Phil Taylor won the title for the eighth time, by defeating James Wade 18–11 in the final.

Prize money
The prize fund increased by £30,000 on the previous year, with the winner now receiving £30,000.

Seeds

Draw

External links
 Pictures from the 2006 World Matchplay Darts

World Matchplay (darts)
World Matchplay Darts